Mount Colliery is a rural locality in the Southern Downs Region, Queensland, Australia.

History 
Tannymorel Colliery State School opened on 17 September 1915. In 1922 it was renamed Mount Colliery State School. It closed in 1968. It was located at 21 Roach Street.

Methodist church services were being held in private homes from at least December 1913. Fund raising to build a Methodist church was underway by June 1914. By October 1914, land for the church had been purchased. The stump-capping ceremony for Mount Colliery Methodist Church was held on Wednesday 27 January 1915. On Sunday 7 March 1915, the church was officially opened by Reverend Charles Martin (chairman of the Downs District Methodist Church). Although built by the Methodists, the church was available for use for any Protestant worship. The first couple to be married in the church were Arthur Collins and Millicent Bolton on 21 April 1915. It was subsequently sold and relocated to 15 Oak Street, Tannymorel, where it is used as a private residence.

The Church of England building was damaged in a cyclone in December 1915. St Augustine's Anglican Church was dedicated on 14 September 1941 by Archbishop William Wand. It closed circa 1989. It was at 17 Roach Street. The property was sold in August 1990 for $6,000. As at 2021, it is a private residence.

Amenities 
The Mount Colliery branch of the Queensland Country Women's Association meets at 7 Bakers Road.

References

Further reading

External links

Southern Downs Region
Localities in Queensland